The 1956 United States presidential election in Michigan was held on November 6, 1956 as part of the 1956 United States presidential election. Voters chose 20 electors to the Electoral College, who voted for president and vice president.

Michigan was won by the Republican Party candidate Dwight D. Eisenhower with 56% of the popular vote, winning the state's twenty electoral votes. However, this result made Michigan almost 4% more Democratic than the nation-at-large.   

Eisenhower would be the last Republican to win Michigan without carrying suburban Macomb County, which he previously won in 1952, but lost to Stevenson in this election. 

This was the last time Michigan voted for a Republican presidential candidate until Eisenhower’s running mate, Richard Nixon, won the state in his re-election bid in 1972.

Results

Results by county

See also
 United States presidential elections in Michigan

Notes

References

Michigan
1956
1956 Michigan elections